Erik Carlsson (21 July 1893 – 18 May 1981) was a Swedish weightlifter. He competed in the men's light heavyweight event at the 1920 Summer Olympics.

References

External links
 

1893 births
1981 deaths
Swedish male weightlifters
Olympic weightlifters of Sweden
Weightlifters at the 1920 Summer Olympics
Sportspeople from Stockholm